Dil Pardesi Ho Gaya is a 2013 Indian Punjabi language film, directed by Thakur Tapasvi, starring Inderjit Nikku and Sana Nawaz Khan in lead roles with Shakti Kapoor, Daljit Kaur, Jaspal Bhatti, Raza Murad, Muhammad Sadiq, Sardar Sohi and other. Akshay Kumar is in the special appearance.

Cast
Inderjit Nikku
Sana Nawaz Khan
Haya Ali
Sardar Kamal
Shakti Kapoor
Ravinder Singh
Jaspal Bhatti
Raza Murad
Parikshit Sahni
Muhammad Sadiq
Sardar Sohi
Akshay Kumar (Special Appearance)
Raj Kumar Verka

References 

Dil Pardesi Ho Gaya

Punjabi-language Indian films
2010s Punjabi-language films